Chongqing Hot Pot is a 2016 Chinese caper screwball comedy film written and directed by Yang Qing and starring Chen Kun, Bai Baihe, Qin Hao and Yu Entai. The film had its world premiere in March 2016 at the 2016 Hong Kong International Film Festival and was released in China by Wuzhou Film Distribution on April 1, 2016.

Plot
From director Yang Qing (One Night at the Supermarket) comes Chongqing Hot Pot, the official opening night film at the Hong Kong International Film Festival. When three friends open a hot pot restaurant in a former bomb shelter, they discover it’s linked by a single wall to the bank vault next door. While deciding to take the easy money or go to the police, they find out one of the bank’s employees is a former classmate and look to enlist her in deciding their future. The movie ended on a happy note with the four friends eating together loosely discussing their future on the roof of the hospital where Liu Bo is admitted.

Cast
 Chen Kun as Liu Bo
 Bai Baihe as Yu Xiaohui
 Qin Hao as Xu Dong
 Yu Entai as Four Eyes

Reception

Box office
The film grossed  on its opening day in China. It grossed  worldwide.

Critical response
Chongqing Hot Pot received a 22% approval rating on review aggregator website Rotten Tomatoes, based on 9 reviews and has an average rating of 6.1/10. James Marsh of Screen Daily said that "while scant characterisation and flailing tonal shifts may prevent the film from standing up to serious scrutiny, Yang is clearly out to have fun, and on that front his belated second feature certainly delivers."

Awards and nominations

References

External links 
 
 
 
 

2010s crime comedy films
2010s screwball comedy films
2010s heist films
Chinese crime comedy films
Wuzhou Film Distribution films
Heyi Pictures films
Wanda Pictures films
Films directed by Yang Qing
Films set in Chongqing
2016 comedy films